Belinda Hocking is a retired Australian backstroke swimmer. She is an Australian Institute of Sport scholarship holder.

Career

Hocking was fifth in the 200-metre back and sixth in the 50 and 100m back at the Telstra Australian Swimming Championships in Brisbane in December 2007, won gold in 4×200-metre freestyle and was fourth in 200-metre backstroke at the Junior Pan Pacific Championships in Maui, Hawaii, claimed gold in the 100- and 200-metre backstroke and 4×100-metre medley relay, to go with silver in the 4×100-metre and 4×200-metre freestyle relays at the Australian Youth Olympic Festival in Sydney, won gold in the 100- and 200-metre backstroke and bronze in the 200-metre freestyle at the Australian Age Championships in Perth, won silver in 100-metre backstroke, was fourth in 50-metre backstroke and fifth in 200-metre backstroke at the Telstra Australian Short Course Championships in Melbourne, and placed third in the 100-metre backstroke at the FINA World Cup in Sydney.

Hocking qualified for the 2008 Summer Olympics in Beijing, and came eighth in the 200-metre backstroke.  She placed second in the 200-metre backstroke, and was third in 100-metre backstroke at the Australian Swimming Championships and Olympic Trials in Sydney.  That year, she also won silver in the 4×100-metre medley (heat swim), and came fifth in the 100-metre backstroke and sixth in the 50-metre backstroke at the FINA World Short Course Championships in Manchester.  She set a Commonwealth record in 50-metre backstroke at World Short Course Championships and she won 100- and 200-metre backstroke at the Monaco leg of the Mare Nostrum series.  She was also second in 100- and 200-metre backstroke at the Barcelona leg of the Mare Nostrum series.

At the 2012 Summer Olympics, she competed in the 100 and 200 m backstroke events, finishing in 7th and 10th respectively.

At the 2014 Commonwealth Games, she won two gold medals in the 200 m backstroke and the 4 x 100 m medley relay, setting Commonwealth Games records in both.  She also won a bronze medal in the 100 m backstroke.

She had to take a break from competing in 2015, after a series of accidents and injuries, including a shoulder injury which required surgery, a dislocated knee and a burn injury caused while studying.  In 2015, she also began to study for a degree in primary education.

At the 2016 Summer Olympics in Rio de Janeiro, Hocking came fifth in the 200 metre backstroke.

Belinda Hocking announced her retirement from competitive Swimming on 3 March 2017.

Personal
Hocking was born in Wangaratta, Victoria. She started swimming when she was 4.

She went to St. Bernard's Catholic Primary School in Wangaratta, and later swam at Nunawading Swimming Club.

See also
 List of World Aquatics Championships medalists in swimming (women)

References

External links
 
 
 
 

Living people
Australian female backstroke swimmers
Australian Institute of Sport swimmers
Commonwealth Games bronze medallists for Australia
Commonwealth Games gold medallists for Australia
World record setters in swimming
Olympic swimmers of Australia
People from Wangaratta
Swimmers at the 2008 Summer Olympics
Swimmers at the 2012 Summer Olympics
Swimmers at the 2014 Commonwealth Games
World Aquatics Championships medalists in swimming
Swimmers at the 2016 Summer Olympics
Commonwealth Games medallists in swimming
People educated at Lake Ginninderra College
1990 births
21st-century Australian women
Sportswomen from Victoria (Australia)
Medallists at the 2014 Commonwealth Games